Trawick is a surname. Notable people with the surname include:

Brynden Trawick (born 1989), American football player
Herb Trawick (1921–1985), American player of Canadian football

See also
Trawick, Texas, unincorporated community in Nacogdoches County, Texas, United States
Traywick, surname